Fletton railway station was a railway station in Fletton, Cambridgeshire just south of Peterborough. It was once home to an extensive goods yard.

References

Disused railway goods stations in Great Britain
Transport in Peterborough
Buildings and structures in Peterborough